Noshahr is a city in Mazandaran Province, Iran.

Noshahr or Now Shahr may also refer to:
 Noshahr, Ardabil
 Noshahr, Gilan
 Noshahr, East Azerbaijan
 Noshahr-e Kalangi, Hormozgan Province
 Noshahr-e Surgi, Hormozgan Province
 Noshahr County, in Mazandaran Province

See also
 Noshar (disambiguation)